Mary "Meg" Loughran Cappel is a Democratic member of the Illinois Senate from the 49th district since December 10, 2020. The 49th district, located in the Chicago area, includes all or parts of  Aurora, Bolingbrook, Boulder Hill, Channahon, Crest Hill, Crystal Lawns, Joliet, Montgomery, Naperville, Oswego, Plainfield, Romeoville, and Shorewood.

Cappel was elected to the Illinois Senate to succeed Jennifer Bertino-Tarrant, who successfully ran for Will County, Illinois Executive. Cappel was appointed early on December 10, 2020 after Bertino-Tarrant resigned her state Senator position and inaugurated as Executive on December 7, 2020.

Early life, education, and career
Cappel grew up in Joliet, Illinois. She is a lifelong educator, specializing in special education. She currently serves on the Shorewood Chamber of Commerce. She previously served as a union representative for AFT-IFT Local 604. In 2019, she and her husband Jason started a small business named Elite Driving School in Shorewood.

Political career
In 2017, Cappel was elected to the Joliet Township High School District 204 Board. In 2020, Cappel ran for the Illinois Senate 49th district and won with a 12% margin of victory.

As of July 2022, Senator Cappel was a member of the following Illinois Senate committee:

 Appropriations - Education Committee (SAPP-SAED)
 Appropriations - Emergency Management Committee (SAPP-SAEM)
 Behavioral and Mental Health Committee (SBMH)
 Commerce Committee (SCOM)
 Education Committee (SESE)
 Labor Committee (SLAB)
 Redistricting - Kankakee & Will Counties Committee (SRED-SDKW)
 State Government Committee (SGOA)

Electoral history

Personal life
Cappel, her husband Jason, and her three children all currently reside in Shorewood, Illinois.

References

External links
Senator Meg Loughran Cappel (D) 49th District at the Illinois General Assembly
Constituent Website

21st-century American politicians
21st-century American women politicians
Democratic Party Illinois state senators
Living people
People from Joliet, Illinois
Women state legislators in Illinois
Year of birth missing (living people)